This is a list of Sigma Lambda Beta International Fraternity, Inc., chapters, represented in over 30 states. In total, there are 141 Undergraduate Chapters, 9 Uncharted Chapters, and 36 Alumni Networks, totaling 186 entities throughout the United States, Puerto Rico and the United Kingdom as of September 2020.

Undergraduate chapters

Uncharted Chapters

Alumni networks

References

External links
Sigma Lambda Beta Official Website

Lists of chapters of United States student societies by society
Fraternities and sororities in Puerto Rico
Hispanic and Latino American organizations
chapters